Eleanor Catton  (born 24 September 1985) is a New Zealand novelist and screenwriter. Born in Canada, Catton moved to New Zealand as a child and grew up in Christchurch. She completed a master's degree in creative writing at the International Institute of Modern Letters. Her award-winning debut novel, The Rehearsal, written as her Master's thesis, was published in 2008, and has been adapted into a 2016 film of the same name. Her second novel, The Luminaries, won the 2013 Booker Prize, making Catton the youngest author ever to win the prize (at age 28) and only the second New Zealander. It was subsequently adapted into a television miniseries, with Catton as screenwriter.

Early life
Catton was born in Canada, where her father was a graduate student completing his doctorate at the University of Western Ontario on a Commonwealth scholarship. Her mother Judith is a New Zealander from Canterbury, while her father, philosopher Philip Catton, comes from Washington State. Her family returned to New Zealand when she was six years old, and Catton grew up in Christchurch. Her mother was a children's librarian at the time, and the family had no TV; Catton was an avid reader and writer from an early age.

At age 13 the family spent a year living in Leeds while her father was on a sabbatical at the university, and Catton attended local comprehensive Lawnswood School which she referred to as "amazing" and "gloriously rough". Back in Christchurch she attended Burnside High School, studied English at the University of Canterbury, and completed a Master's degree in Creative Writing at the International Institute of Modern Letters, Victoria University of Wellington. She is related to historian Bruce Catton.

Literary career

The Rehearsal
Catton's debut novel, The Rehearsal, was published in 2008 when she was 22. Written as her Master's thesis, it deals with reactions to an affair between a male teacher and a girl at his secondary school. The Rehearsal won the 2009 Betty Trask Award in the UK, and was longlisted for the Orange Prize and on the shortlist of the Guardian First Book Award.

That year Catton was awarded a fellowship to the Iowa Writers' Workshop, where she completed her MFA and taught creative writing until 2011. In 2011, she was the Ursula Bethell Writer in Residence at the University of Canterbury, and in 2012 a writer in residence at the Michael King Writers' Centre in Auckland.

In 2016, The Rehearsal was adapted into a film of the same name directed by Alison Maclean. It was screened in the Contemporary World Cinema section at the 2016 Toronto International Film Festival.

The Luminaries

Catton's second novel The Luminaries was begun at the Iowa Writers' Workshop, when she was 25, and published in 2013. The novel is set on the goldfields of New Zealand in 1866. It was shortlisted for and subsequently won the 2013 Booker Prize, making Catton at the age of 28 the youngest author ever to win the Booker, beating more established names like Jhumpa Lahiri and Colm Tóibín. Catton was previously, at the age of 27, the youngest author ever to be shortlisted for the Booker Prize.

At 832 pages, The Luminaries was the longest work to win the prize in its 45-year history. The chair of the judges, Robert Macfarlane commented, "It's a dazzling work. It's a luminous work. It is vast without being sprawling." Jonathan Ruppin of Foyles said: "I'm confident that she is destined to be one of the most important and influential writers of her generation." Catton was presented with the prize by the Duchess of Cornwall on 15 October 2013 at Guildhall.

In November 2013 Catton was awarded the Canadian Governor General's Literary Award for fiction for The Luminaries. In January 2014 it was announced that Catton would be awarded an honorary degree of Doctor of Literature in May at Victoria University of Wellington, where she has studied. In the 2014 New Year Honours, she was appointed a Member of the New Zealand Order of Merit for services to literature.

Screenwriting
Catton made zombie movies with her friends as a teenager and participated in the 48Hours film challenge, but never studied screenwriting.

When Luminaries was adapted into a television miniseries Catton was screenwriter, an "unusual if not entirely unheard-of" arrangement. Catton wrote hundreds of drafts of the pilot episode, but in late 2015 BBC Two declined the series; she then shifted the focus to make the protagonist Anna Wetherell, a minor character in the book, and rewrote the series, which was commissioned by the BBC in mid-2016. She served as showrunner with director Claire McCarthy during filming. The six-episode TVNZ and BBC series debuted on 17 May 2020.

Catton also wrote the screenplay for the 2020 film version of Emma, adapted from Jane Austen's novel. She admitted she had never actually read the novel when approached to write the screenplay, but was familiar with more recent adaptations, including the film Clueless.

Birnam Wood
Catton's third novel, Birnam Wood, was published in February 2023. The title is taken from Macbeth, and Catton has said the novel draws inspiration from the play. It is a contemporary thriller about a group of young climate activists who call themselves Birnam Wood.

Politics

In an interview at the Jaipur Literary Festival in January 2015, Catton said that the governments of Australia, Canada and New Zealand were led by "neo-liberal, profit-obsessed, very shallow, very money-hungry politicians who do not care about culture... They care about short-term gains. They would destroy the planet in order to be able to have the life they want. I feel very angry with my Government".

Prime Minister John Key said he was disappointed at Catton's lack of respect for his Government and claimed she was aligned with the Green Party. The next day he said her views should not be given any more credence than those of the Peter "The Mad Butcher" Leitch or Richie McCaw.

In January 2015, on air RadioLive host Sean Plunket called Catton a traitor and an "ungrateful hua", a Māori slang word which some listeners mistook for "whore". The Taxpayers' Union also released a media statement showing Catton had received around $50,000 in Creative New Zealand support over her career, and argued that "if Ms Catton isn't thankful for the support by the New Zealand Government while she wrote The Luminaries, maybe she should use some of the substantial royalties to pay the money back".

In a blog post responding to the affair, Catton commented that her reported remarks were a condensed part of a larger interview, and she was puzzled why her comment at the Jaipur festival had generated such controversy: "I’ve been speaking freely to foreign journalists ever since I was first published overseas, and have criticised the Key government, neo-liberal values, and our culture of anti-intellectualism many times." She continued:

The criticism of Catton caused a media storm, including the publication of numerous cartoons, and was termed "Cattongate" by political commentator Bryce Edwards. Edwards quoted numerous other commentators who supported Catton's right to express her views, and said the controversy reflected the hollowness of public debate in New Zealand and of the media and politics.

Personal life
Catton met Chicago-born poet Steven Toussaint at the Iowa Writers' Workshop, and Toussaint moved to New Zealand in 2011 to begin a PhD in US avant-garde poetry at Victoria University of Wellington. The couple later lived in Mount Eden with their two cats (Laura Palmer and Isis) while Catton taught creative writing part-time at the Manukau Institute of Technology. Catton describes Toussaint as the first reader of her drafts, and he prevailed in an argument over whether one character in The Luminaries should be killed off. They married on 3 January 2016.  the couple live in Cambridge, England with their daughter.

Philanthropy 
In 2014 Catton used her winnings from the New Zealand Post Book Awards to establish the Lancewood/Horoeka Grant. The grant offers a stipend to emerging writers with the aim of providing "the means and opportunity not to write, but to read, and to share what they learn through their reading with their colleagues in the arts". Recipients have included Amy Brown, Craig Cliff and Richard Meros.

Awards and honours
2007
Adam Foundation Prize in Creative Writing for The Rehearsal
The Sunday Star-Times (NZ) Short Story Competition for Necropolis
2008
Glenn Schaeffer Fellowship at the Iowa Writers' Workshop
Louis Johnson New Writers' Bursary
2009
Betty Trask Award for The Rehearsal
New Zealand Society of Authors Hubert Church (Montana) Best First Book Award for Fiction for The Rehearsal
Guardian First Book Award shortlist for The Rehearsal
Orange Prize longlist for The Rehearsal
2010
Amazon.ca First Novel Award for The Rehearsal
2013
Booker Prize for The Luminaries
Governor General's Award for English-language fiction for The Luminaries
2014
New Zealand Post Book Awards Fiction Award and People's Choice Award for The Luminaries
Walter Scott Prize shortlist for The Luminaries
DLitt, an honorary doctorate awarded by the Victoria University of Wellington

Works

Novels
 
 
 
 Doubtful Sound (TBC)

Short stories
 Various short stories published in Best New Zealand Fiction Vol. 5 (2008); the Penguin Book of Contemporary New Zealand Short Stories (2009), and Granta issue 106 (Summer 2009).

Further reading

 Wolfe, Graham. (2016). "Eleanor Catton’s The Rehearsal: Theatrical Fantasy and the Gaze." Mosaic: A Journal for the Interdisciplinary Study of Literature 49.3: 91–108.

References

External links

Horoeka Reading grant
Sunday Times, July 2009 (paywall)
Excerpts from Eleanor Catton's Reading Journal, Turbine, 2007

Interviews
"Interview with Eleanor Catton", The New Zealand Herald, September 2013
Radio interview on The Bat Segundo Show, 71 minutes, 2013
A collection of interviews with Catton, on the Radio New Zealand National website

Biographies
Profile of Catton on the Read NZ Te Pou Muramura (formerly New Zealand Book Council) website
Catton's author profile on the Granta website
Catton's author profile on the Victoria University Press website

1985 births
Booker Prize winners
Iowa Writers' Workshop alumni
Living people
New Zealand women short story writers
New Zealand women novelists
New Zealand crime fiction writers
Canadian emigrants to New Zealand
People educated at Burnside High School
People from Christchurch
Writers from London, Ontario
University of Canterbury alumni
International Institute of Modern Letters alumni
21st-century New Zealand novelists
21st-century Canadian women writers
21st-century Canadian novelists
Women crime fiction writers
21st-century New Zealand short story writers
Members of the New Zealand Order of Merit
Canadian women novelists
Academic staff of Manukau Institute of Technology
People educated at Lawnswood School
Governor General's Award-winning fiction writers
Amazon.ca First Novel Award winners